Woodley may refer to:

Places
 Woodley, Saskatchewan, a hamlet in Benson No. 35, Rural Municipality, Saskatchewan, Canada
 Woodley, Nairobi, a suburb of Nairobi, Kenya, south of Kilimani
 Woodley, Berkshire, a town near Reading in Berkshire, England, UK
 Woodley, Greater Manchester, a suburban area near Stockport in Greater Manchester, England, UK
 Woodley, Hampshire, a United Kingdom location near Romsey in Hampshire, England

People with the surname 
 Allan Woodley, Australian rules footballer
 Anita Woodley, American writer
 Bruce Woodley, Australian singer-songwriter and musician
 David Woodley, American football player
 Fabian S. Woodley (1888–1957), British poet
 Frank Woodley, Australian comedian 
 John Woodley (born 1938), Australian politician and church minister
 John Paul Woodley Jr., American politician 
 LaMarr Woodley, American football linebacker
 Shailene Woodley, American actress
 Tyron Woodley, American professional mixed martial artist
 Vic Woodley, English football goalkeeper
William Woodley, Governor of the Leeward Islands

Other uses
 Woodley (TV series), an Australian TV comedy starring Frank Woodley
 Woodley Airways, a small airline in Alaska in the 1930s–40s
 Woodley station (Los Angeles Metro)

See also
 Woodley Mansion, a historic residence in Washington, D.C.
 Woodley Park, Washington, D.C., a neighbourhood of the city of Washington, United States